Modern Love is a 1929 American comedy film directed by Arch Heath and written by Albert DeMond and Beatrice Van. The film stars Charley Chase, Kathryn Crawford, Jean Hersholt, Edward Martindel, Anita Garvin and Betty Montgomery. The film was released on July 21, 1929, by Universal Pictures.

Plot 
In order to keep her job, a young dress designer must keep her recent marriage a secret from her boss. An important client arrives from Paris and her boss decides to hold a dinner party for the man at the girl's house. When her husband finds out that the client wants to take her back to Paris so she can "study", he comes up with a plan to stop it, and it begins with his being the "server" at the dinner party.

Cast        
Charley Chase as John Jones
Kathryn Crawford as Patricia Brown
Jean Hersholt as François Renault
Edward Martindel as Andre Weston
Anita Garvin as Mrs. Weston 
Betty Montgomery as The Blonde
Dorothy Coburn as Half and Half

References

External links
 

1929 films
1920s English-language films
American comedy films
1929 comedy films
Universal Pictures films
American black-and-white films
Films directed by Arch Heath
1920s American films